The Battle of Hackham Heath is the second novel in the Ranger's Apprentice: The Early Years series written by Australian author John Flanagan. It was first released in Australia on 31 October 2016, and in the United States on 29 November 2016. The series serves as a prequel to the Ranger's Apprentice series, and is a direct sequel to a story in The Lost Stories.

External links
Official site
 The Battle of Hackham Heath at Random House Australia
 The Battle of Hackham Heath at Random House (UK)
 The Battle of Hackham Heath at Penguin Group (USA)

Ranger's Apprentice books
Australian fantasy novels
2016 Australian novels
Novels by John Flanagan
Random House books
Philomel Books books